Bone is a bimonthly peer-reviewed medical journal covering the study of bone biology and mineral metabolism. It was established in 1978 as Metabolic Bone Disease and Related Research, obtaining its current name in 1985. It is published by Elsevier and the editor-in-chief is Sundeep Khosla (Mayo Clinic). According to the Journal Citation Reports, the journal has a 2019 impact factor of 4.147.

References

External links

Orthopedics journals
Elsevier academic journals
Publications established in 1978
Bimonthly journals
English-language journals